Cytonn Investments is an international real estate company with offices in Nairobi, Kenya and DC Metro Area in the United States.

Cytonn's major target customers are global institutions, local institutions, high net worth individuals and local investors, whom the company seeks to offer alternative investment solutions.

History 
In 2014, four senior managers at publicly listed British-American Investments Company (Britam), left the company to form their own private equity firm which they named Cytonn. The move by the four presented a huge blow to their former employer, owing to their contribution towards making Britam the leading investments company in Kenya.

 The four are:

 Edwin Dande - Chief Executive Officer at Cytonn
 Shiv Arora - Former Chief Financial Officer at Cytonn 
 Patricia Wanjama - Head of Legal at Cytonn 
 Elizabeth Nkukuu - Chief Investment Officer at Cytonn
The four are said to have been motivated by the desire to have an independent investment firm that would offer competitive services to clients, that was yet to be offered in the country. Thus, the company was founded on a novel dream of being client-focused.

Cytonn brought up an unprecedented shake up in the investments industry, reflected through the enormous profit of Ksh 630 million it posted during its first year of operation. The company has put a number of its business under Administration and 4,000 investors are in courts with Cytonn because of its failure to owner obligations

Cytonn’s investments are organised into four main classes
Private Equity
Cytonn focuses in the areas of (a) Banking (b) Insurance (c) Hospitality (d) Education.

Real Estate 
Focusing in the areas of (i) real estate investments (ii) real estate backed fixed income notes and (iii) rent stabilized investments units. With ten Ongoing projects.

High Yield
Includes:
 Cytonn High Yield Solutions (CHYS: For short term investors)
 Cytonn Project Notes: For medium to long-term investments

Asset Managers
Cytonn Asset Managers offers a range of differentiated Unit Trust Products to both institutional and retail investors as well as foreign investors.

Ownership
The company stock is owned by the four founders of the firm. In 2015, the founders sold 10 percent of the company stock to "high net-worth investors". The shareholding in the business is as depicted in the table below.

In February 2019, Cytonn's Chief Executive Officer, Edwin Dande, indicated that the firm was considering listing its shares on the Nairobi Stock Exchange and subsequently cross-listing on the London Stock Exchange.

Controversy
The Kenyan Capital Markets Authority (CMA) on several occasions opened investigations into Cytonn High Yield Solutions (CHYS) and Cytonn Project Notes (CPN). The regulator does not regulate the two funds, which have failed to pay investors upon maturity of their investments totaling Sh13.5bn.

See also
 British-American Investments Company 
 Centum Investments
 Capital Markets Authority (Kenya)
 Economy of Kenya

References

External links
Webpage of Cytonn Investments Management Limited

Nairobi
Companies based in Nairobi
Investment companies of Kenya
Conglomerate companies of Kenya
Financial services companies established in 2014
Kenyan companies established in 2014